Evertek is a Tunisian mobile manufacturer. Evertek is a trademark of Cellcom, which in turn is part of the Tunisian company YKH Group. Started in 2008, Evertek produced several mobile phones (Dual and triple SIM) and is gaining progressive access to the Tunisian market.

As of 2010, Evertek handsets had 10% market share in Tunisia, and are also sold in Morocco, France, and on British Airways, KLM and Virgin Atlantic flights. In January 2018,Evertek launched V4 Nano smartphone. In June 2018, Evertek launched new Android smartphone V8 curved.

References

External links
 (fr) Official website

Mobile phone manufacturers
Manufacturing companies of Tunisia
Telecommunications companies of Tunisia
Electronics companies established in 2008
Telecommunications companies established in 2008
2008 establishments in Tunisia
Tunisian brands
Computer companies established in 2008